Frecăței is a commune in Tulcea County, Northern Dobruja, Romania. It is composed of four villages: Cataloi, Frecăței, Poșta and Telița.

References

Communes in Tulcea County
Localities in Northern Dobruja